The Rybicki–Press algorithm is a fast algorithm for inverting a matrix whose entries are given by , where  and where the  are sorted in order. The key observation behind the Rybicki-Press observation is that the matrix inverse of such a matrix is always a tridiagonal matrix (a matrix with nonzero entries only on the main diagonal and the two adjoining ones), and tridiagonal systems of equations can be solved efficiently (to be more precise, in linear time). It is a computational optimization of a general set of statistical methods developed to determine whether two noisy, irregularly sampled data sets are, in fact, dimensionally shifted representations of the same underlying function. The most common use of the algorithm is in the detection of periodicity in astronomical observations, such as for detecting quasars.

The method has been extended to the Generalized Rybicki-Press algorithm for inverting matrices with entries of the form . The key observation in the Generalized Rybicki-Press (GRP) algorithm is that the matrix  is a semi-separable matrix with rank  (that is, a matrix whose upper half, not including the main diagonal, is that of some matrix with matrix rank  and whose lower half is also that of some possibly different rank  matrix) and so can be embedded into a larger band matrix (see figure on the right), whose sparsity structure can be leveraged to reduce the computational complexity.

The fact that matrix  is a semi-separable matrix also forms the basis for  library, which is a library for fast and scalable Gaussian process regression in one dimension with implementations in C++, Python, and Julia. The  method also provides an algorithm for generating samples from a high-dimensional distribution. The method has found attractive applications in a wide range of fields, especially in astronomical data analysis.

See also
Invertible matrix
Matrix decomposition
Multidimensional signal processing
System of linear equations

References

External links 
 Implementation of the Generalized Rybicki Press algorithm
 celerite library on GitHub 

Numerical linear algebra